Manitoba High Schools Athletics Association oversees high school altheltic competitions in the Canadian province of Manitoba. It also has a hall of fame

Discrimination against girls
The MHSAA was forced to allow girls to play on boys' teams as the result of a court case.

Notable coaches 
Michelle Sawatzky-Koop, Steinbach Regional Secondary School

References

External links

Sport in Manitoba
High school sport in Canada 
High schools in Manitoba